Michael Harden (born October 21, 1981) is a former professional American football cornerback. He was signed by the Seattle Seahawks as an undrafted free agent in 2004. He played college football at Missouri.

Harden has also played for the Berlin Thunder and Hamburg Sea Devils.

References

External links
 Missouri Tigers bio

1981 births
Living people
Players of American football from Kansas City, Missouri
American football cornerbacks
Missouri Tigers football players
Seattle Seahawks players
Berlin Thunder players
Hamburg Sea Devils players